Jorge Siega (born Brazil) is a former Brazilian-American football (soccer) forward who spent eight seasons in the North American Soccer League, seven with the New York Cosmos.  He also earned eight caps with the U.S. national team in 1973.

NASL
Siega joined the Washington Whips of the North American Soccer League (NASL) in 1968.  The Whips folded at the end of the season and Siega moved to the German-Hungarians of the German American Soccer League.  In 1971, he was the first player signed by the expansion New York Cosmos.  He was a second team All Star in 1971 and 1972 and continued with the Cosmos through the 1976 season.

National team
Siega earned his first cap on March 17, 1973 in a 4-0 loss to Bermuda.  He went on to play a total of eight games with the national team in 1973. His last came in a 3-1 loss to Israel on November 13, 1973.

Post NASL career
After leaving the NASL, Siega continued playing amateur and semi-professional soccer with the German-Hungarian Metros in the New York Cosmopolitan Soccer League.  He also coached for Blau-Weiss Gottschee.

References

External links
 NASL stats

1947 births
People from Rio Grande do Sul
American soccer players
Brazilian emigrants to the United States
United States men's international soccer players
German-American Soccer League players
North American Soccer League (1968–1984) players
Washington Whips players
New York Cosmos players
Living people

Association football forwards